Gammy may refer to:
One of the children born in the 2014 Thai surrogacy controversy
A disguise used by the character Pistachio Disguisey in the film The Master of Disguise